Brianna Titone is an American politician and scientist, currently serving as a member of the Colorado House of Representatives from the 27th district. She serves in the 74th Colorado General Assembly and is the first openly transgender state legislator elected in Colorado and the 4th elected in the United States.

Early life and education
Titone was born and raised in the Hudson Valley region of New York.

Titone attended the State University of New York at New Paltz from 1996 to 2002 where she earned bachelor's degrees in geology and physics. She later earned a master's degree in geochemistry at Stony Brook University, and another master's degree in information and communications technology at the University of Denver. At Stony Brook, her master's thesis was on rare-earth element and thorium speciation of fossils and sediments of the Green River Formation. Some of her research was conducted at Brookhaven National Laboratory using the National Synchrotron Light Source X-26A and X-18B beamlines.

Career
Before entering politics, Titone worked as a mining consultant, geologist, and software developer. For seven years, beginning in high school, she was a volunteer firefighter.

Politics 
In 2016, Titone joined the Jefferson County, Colorado Democratic LGBT caucus and was elected its Secretary/Treasurer, and later appointed a "captain at large".

She declared her run for Colorado House of Representatives HD27 in December 2017. She received 50.4% of the vote to win the election with 24,957 votes out of 49,475, a margin of 439. She serves on the Health and Insurance Committee, the Rural Affairs and Agriculture Committee, and the Joint Technology Committee. She was also appointed to the Energy Council.

In the 2nd regular session of the 72nd General Assembly, she worked to bring back and pass the bill banning the "Gay or Trans Panic Defense". The bill passed on a margin of 98-1-1.

She won re-election in the most competitive House race in Colorado earning 29,566 (48.7%) of 60,708 votes against her two opponents in the November 2020 election.

In the 2022 general election, Titone was re-elected with around 57.7% of the votes cast. Later in November, Titone was selected to serve as caucus chair of the state House majority which is a first for a trans lawmaker to serve in an elected leadership position in a General Assembly.

References

External links
 Official website

Democratic Party members of the Colorado House of Representatives
LGBT state legislators in Colorado
Women state legislators in Colorado
Transgender politicians
Transgender scientists
Transgender women
People from Arvada, Colorado
Year of birth missing (living people)
Living people
State University of New York at New Paltz alumni
American LGBT scientists
21st-century American politicians
21st-century American women politicians
21st-century American LGBT people